The India–Pakistan field hockey rivalry is among the most intense sports rivalries in the Asia and the world in the sport of field hockey. India and Pakistan have played against each other several times in field hockey. They participate in Asian Games, Commonwealth Games, Asia Cup, Champions Trophy, Sultan Azlan Shah Cup, World Cup and the Summer Olympic Games.

India and Pakistan have a record of facing each other in the first seven Asian games hockey finals. They have played a total of nine finals against each other in which Pakistan has won seven gold and India has won two gold. Both nations have played each other from 1956 to 1964 in three successive Olympic Hockey finals. India won gold twice while Pakistan won once. They played in four Asia cup finals against each other. Pakistan won three out of those. Pakistan have a record of winning the first three Asia Cup (i.e. 1982, 1985 and 1989) against India in row. Both teams participate in Sultan Azlan Shah Cup which is held every year in Malaysia. The only World Cup final played between India and Pakistan was in 1975, which resulted in a 2–1 win for India.

Statistics
By Year
Year wise record of India vs Pakistan Hockey:

By Tournament
The record between India and Pakistan by tournament is:

Major tournaments won
 indicates that the team  holds record number of titles in that competition.

Records

Top goal-scorers 
Pakistan

Source: 

India

Source:

Test Series 

India and Pakistan have played test series from 1978 to 2006. They played eight series in this span out of which Pakistan have won six, India one and one series drawn. Out of a total 52 matches played Pakistan has won 25, India 16 and 11 matches ending in draws. The goal aggregation so far is 124–104 in Pakistan's favour. Reports of the series being revived emerged in 2013 and 2017, but have not materialized as of 2022.

Results in major tournaments 
The following table show India vs Pakistan in major tournaments :

Other matches
Other matches played between India and Pakistan are:

Players who have played for both teams
Prior to the Partition of India in 1947 India had played field hockey, having first played as an international side in 1926. Following the Partition, Pakistan was created and began playing as an independent nation, making their debut at the 1948 Summer Olympics.

The following players played for Pakistan in Olympics after appearing for India. They are:
Ali Dara – Represented India at 1936 Olympics; and for Pakistan at 1948 Olympics
Latif-ur Rehman – Represented India at 1948 Olympics; and for Pakistan at 1952 and 1956 Olympics
Akhtar Hussain – Represented India at 1948 Olympics; and for Pakistan at 1956 Olympics

See also
India–Pakistan relations
India–Pakistan sports rivalries
India–Pakistan cricket rivalry
India–Pakistan football rivalry

References

Past winners Azlan Shah Cup

External links
All Other Indo–Pak Matches
Z News India beat Pakistan 2–1
India waste 3–0 lead in ill-tempered match vs Pak
Field hockey rivalry draws huge crowd 

 
Field hockey in India
Field hockey in Pakistan
Pakistan
field hockey